Rudolf Winter-Ebmer (born 1961 in Steyr, Austria) is an Austrian economist and professor of labor economics at Johannes Kepler University Linz, where he is also chair of the department of economics. He is also a fellow at the Institute for Advanced Studies in Vienna, Austria. Since 2011, he has also been  associate editor of the Institute's official journal, Empirical Economics. He is heading a Christian-Doppler Laboratory of "Ageing, Health and the Labor Market" at the Johannes-Kepler-University of Linz. He is a member of the German Academy of Sciences (Leopoldina) and a former President of the European Society for Population Economics. 

Starting 2021, he is President of the Austrian Economic Association (NOEG).

References

External links
Faculty page

Austrian economists
Labor economists
1961 births
Living people
People from Steyr
Johannes Kepler University Linz alumni
Academic staff of Johannes Kepler University Linz
Theodor Körner Prize recipients